Svetlana Kuznetsova was the defending champion, but withdrew from her second round match due to a lower left leg injury.

Sloane Stephens won her first WTA title, defeating Anastasia Pavlyuchenkova in the final, 6–1, 6–2.

Seeds

Draw

Finals

Top half

Bottom half

Qualifying

Seeds

Qualifiers

Draw

First qualifier

Second qualifier

Third qualifier

Fourth qualifier

References
Main Draw
Qualifying Draw

Citi Open - Women's Singles